Diamond Head are an English heavy metal band formed in 1976 in Stourbridge, West Midlands. The band was part of the new wave of British heavy metal movement and is acknowledged by thrash metal bands such as Metallica and Megadeth as an important early influence.

History

Early history
Brian Tatler formed the band with drummer Duncan Scott while still attending at school. In June 1976 they found singer Sean Harris, who was in the same year, and went through three bass players before settling on Collin Kimberley in Feb 1978. The band recorded two self-financed demo tapes in 1979. They were recorded within six hours on a four-track, one of which was sent to Geoff Barton at Sounds. The timing was perfect with the emergence of the new wave of British heavy metal. In 1979/80, Diamond Head were managed by budding local managers Dave Morris and Ian Frazier. Morris put some money into the band and tried to get the band a record deal; Frazier took to driving the band around the UK when on tour. Sean Harris's mother (Linda Harris) persuaded her boss and boyfriend (Reg Fellows) to come and see the band with a view to investing in them. Diamond Head's demos and live reputation gained enough attention for the band to get two support dates with AC/DC and one with Iron Maiden at The Lyceum, London. Although several record companies expressed interest in signing the band, and their managers secured a couple of offers, none were deemed worthy by Fellows and Linda Harris, who were now beginning to advise Sean Harris as he still lived at home with his mother.  

A difference of opinions about how to manage Diamond Head followed, which eventually led to Morris and Frazier quitting their role as managers, and the job fell solely to Fellows and Linda Harris. Thus while other new waves of British heavy metal bands were signed to major labels and putting their toe into the US market, Diamond Head remained independent. Guitarist Brian Tatler thinks that their joint managers had unrealistic expectations about the kind of record deal the band should sign, and when no deal lived up to this, Fellows decided that the band should record an album quickly and cheaply at a local 24 track studio, where they had recorded their first single "Shoot Out the Lights"; no money exchanged hands, and the studio owner Muff Murfin - in return for a week of studio time - took 50 percent of the bands publishing for fifteen years. It is believed that tapes were passed onto various labels, but when the debut album, Lightning to the Nations, failed to secure a record deal, management decided that they would release 1000 copies of the album on an independent label (also owned by Muff Murfin) called Happy Face Records. 

The album was packaged in a plain sleeve with no title or track listings, and 250 copies were signed by each band member. The management thought that it should be perceived as a 'demo' album, so no fancy sleeve was required, making it very cheap to produce. The first 1000 copies were pressed and made available at concerts and via mail-order for £3.50. The only mail-order advertisement appeared in Sounds and ran for six weeks. The band's management did not pay for the advertisement and ended up being sued.

The original stereo master tapes were lost after they were sent to the German record company, Woolfe Records, who released a vinyl version of the album with a new sleeve. The tapes were not returned until they were eventually tracked down by Lars Ulrich and Phonogram Germany for inclusion on the 1990 compilation album, New Wave of British Heavy Metal '79 Revisited.

In 1980, Pete Winkelman from Wolverhampton got involved and tried to sign Diamond Head to his new label, Media Records. Winkelman had been a record plugger and he advised the band to change management but this advice was not heeded. In the end, Diamond Head only agreed to make one single for Winkelman, a re-recorded version of "Sweet & Innocent" b/w "Streets of Gold", which came out around October 1980.

In January 1981, Diamond Head successfully opened for April Wine on their UK tour. An ambitious UK tour was planned for the summer as a way of being perceived as being more popular than they actually were. An EP called Diamond Lights was recorded quickly in three days to help pay towards the expenses. The management hired a tour bus for band and crew, and an articulated lorry filled with hired PA and lighting. They also hired the Wolverhampton chapter of Hells Angels to perform security duties on the whole tour. They bypassed promoters and booked the venues with a local agent to avoid paying a percentage, but with little promotion for the tour, it lost money. 

The only A&R man who was determined to sign the band was Charlie Eyre, who quit his job at A&M and joined MCA in order to sign Diamond Head and Musical Youth. Discussions went on for around six months until the band finally inked a five-album deal on 1 January 1982.

Borrowed Time
First on the agenda was to record and release the Four Cuts EP, which contained two early era songs, "Shoot Out the Lights" and "Dead Reckoning", and the band did a whistle-stop UK tour of the clubs to promote it. A link-up with agent Neil Warnock at The Agency secured Diamond Head a Friday night slot on the Reading Festival bill in 1982, albeit as late and unadvertised replacements for Manowar. Their set was recorded by the BBC and later released in 1992 through Raw Fruit Records as the Friday Rock Show Sessions.

Their first MCA album, Borrowed Time, featured a lavish Rodney Matthews-illustrated gatefold sleeve based on the album's Elric theme and was the most expensive sleeve commissioned by MCA at the time. The album was somewhat successful commercially, climbing to No 24 in the UK Albums Chart. The band were able to perform a full-scale UK tour at premier venues such as London's Hammersmith Odeon. 

To support the album, Diamond Head's released their sixth single, "In the Heat of the Night", backed with live versions of "Play It Loud" and "Sweet and Innocent" recorded at the Zig-Zag club, and an interview with DJ Tommy Vance (although the latter was not available on the 12").

Canterbury
Once the two-week UK tour was over, they were told to start writing the next album. The band tried a more experimental sounding follow-up to Borrowed Time, tentatively titled Making Music which was re-named Canterbury in 1983. Using top engineer Mike Shipley at an expensive London studio, called Battery in Willesden, put immense pressure on the band. Scott struggled to adapt to this new level of scrutiny and was fired, after completing just six drum tracks in three weeks. Then once all the bass parts had been recorded, Kimberley also quit Diamond Head. The album now fell to Harris and Tatler to finish causing the former to almost have a nervous breakdown. The initial success of the album was stalled as the first 20,000 copies suffered vinyl pressing problems, causing the LP to jump. It made number 32 in the UK Albums Chart, and it was noted that the album cost more to make but sold less. Diamond Head were invited to open that year's Monsters of Rock Festival and, for the first time, toured Europe as special guests of Black Sabbath. On 1 January 1984, MCA did not pick up the option for a third album.

1984 to 2000
In early 1984, Diamond Head did an 18-date UK tour which lost money. Harris and Tatler continued to write together, and in October/November, Diamond Head re-convened in a purpose-built studio in Stambermill, West Midlands, to record their next album. It was never finished, and the band fell apart in early 1985. Tatler took over the running of the studio called RPK while Harris signed a solo deal with Pete Winkelman's new label I Major Records. This culminated in Harris and Robin George making an expensive album together under the name Notorious. In 1990, Winkelman encouraged Harris to make another Diamond Head record and so put him and Tatler back in touch after a long break. The band did two UK tours, and eventually, Death and Progress was released in June 1993, featuring guest contributions by Tony Iommi of Black Sabbath and Dave Mustaine of Megadeth. However, the reunion was short lived as they were on the verge of splitting up as soon as the record was released. The last gig Diamond Head played was at Milton Keynes Bowl opening for Metallica. Towards the end of 1992, Harris grew dissatisfied with the album and Tatler and wanted to move on. Winkelman tried to broker a deal with RCA records for a 'new' band that would feature a new line-up. They performed one gig in Northampton under the name Magnetic AKA, but a deal failed to materialize, and it all fell apart.

2000s
In 2000, Harris and Tatler reunited to perform some acoustic, un-plugged type gigs in the UK. They reworked the old songs and began recording a four track acoustic EP, although this ended up taking two years, and by the time it came out on the band's own label, the acoustic phase was over. They accepted an offer to play the Metal Meltdown Festival in New Jersey on 5 April 2002 (Diamond Head's first US show). An electric band was put together, and a 14 date UK tour was booked for August 2002. A new Diamond Head album was planned, and Mad Hat Studio in Wolverhampton was booked along with producer Andy Scarth. About halfway through the recording, Harris announced that he wanted to change the name of the band to 'Host'. This did not go down well with everyone, and when in 2003 Harris failed to get a deal for the album (which had cost around £16,000), things went quiet. Later that year, Diamond Head and Harris finally went their separate ways.

Nick Tart era

Nick Tart (from Cannock) was asked to join Diamond Head in 2004, the band wrote and recorded the All Will Be Revealed,album and released it in 2005. To promote this album, they completed a 22 date European tour with Megadeth. Brian Tatler commented that this was one of the best experiences of his life, and he regained his enjoyment for playing live with the band again.
Diamond Head headlined a celebration of the 25th anniversary of the NWOBHM at the London Astoria, supported by Witchfynde, Bronz, Praying Mantis, and Jaguar. This concert was later released as a live CD titled It's Electric and also the band's first DVD, To the Devil His Due, in 2006. The band's rhythm guitarist Adrian Mills left the band and was replaced with Andy 'Abbz' Abberley, previously in Cannock band Chase with drummer Karl Wilcox. In 2007 Diamond Head released What's in Your Head? produced by Dave (Shirt) Nichols. In 2008, Nick announced that he and his family were going to emigrate to Brisbane. The band continued to tour but now has the extra expense of flying the singer backward and forwards from Australia. Diamond Head toured the US (twice) plus Japan and Europe, including two dates opening for the Big 4. Nick's last show with Diamond Head was 4 October 2013.

Rasmus Bom Andersen era (2014–present) 
After recruiting new vocalist Rasmus Bom Andersen (a Danish-born singer living in London) in 2014, Diamond Head toured the UK and began work on their self-titled album Diamond Head, released in 2016. The band took part in the 70000 Tons of Metal cruise around the Caribbean and toured the US, Canada and Europe. Work began on their eighth studio album, The Coffin Train, in mid-2016, and it was released in May 2019. By this time, Diamond Head had signed to Silver Lining Records and is now managed by Siren Management. The album entered the UK Rock & Metal Albums Chart at number 5, ten places higher than the band's self-titled album. In 2018 Diamond Head did a UK and European tour and then opened for Black Star Riders across Europe in 2019.

Influences
Diamond Head have cited their early inspirations as classic 1970s British rock bands such as Deep Purple, Led Zeppelin, UFO, Black Sabbath, Judas Priest, and Free, Brian Tatler relating that the first albums he bought were Led Zeppelin's Led Zeppelin II and Deep Purple's Machine Head, and said that although a lot of his guitar work was inspired by Ritchie Blackmore and Michael Schenker, it was punk rock that showed him that anyone could form a band. Colin Kimberley commented Diamond Head got their complex sound from listening to bands like Black Sabbath and Rush and realising that a song with a single riff throughout was not interesting enough.

In a recent interview, Tatler stated that he now tries not to be influenced by modern bands and keep his sound, although he imagines that "little bits creep into the writing process."

The Canadian new wave band Men Without Hats' 1991 album Sideways features a track called "Life After Diamond Head", a reference to the band.

Lack of commercial success
Many reasons have been cited why Diamond Head never achieved significant commercial success, focused mainly on their change in musical direction with Canterbury and their delay in obtaining a record deal. Once they did sign to a major label, MCA proved to be the wrong label, forcing the band to sound more commercial. Also, while successful bands like Iron Maiden and Def Leppard were managed by established music management, Diamond Head were managed by Reg Fellows and the lead singer's mother, neither of whom had managed a band before. In addition, though many of their NWOBHM brethren toured the United States in the 1980s, Diamond Head did not set foot on US soil until 2002, performing one show at Metal Meltdown IV, New Jersey.

Influence on Metallica

American heavy metal band Metallica have covered the likes of "Sucking My Love", "Am I Evil?" and "The Prince" during their initial performances. The Metal Up Your Ass live demo, recorded in November of 1982, featured a live rendition of "Am I Evil?". "Sucking My Love" exists on various bootlegs that have been circulating since 1982, along with a recording on the early demo No Life Til Leather.

Metallica's first official studio release of "Am I Evil?" came in 1984 as part of the Creeping Death 12-inch single paired with another NWOBHM classic "Blitzkrieg", by the band of the same name. The two songs were also included in the first pressing of the Kill 'Em All LP when it was re-released by Elektra Records. A cover of "Helpless" was featured The $5.98 E.P. - Garage Days Re-Revisited in 1987 and "The Prince" was included as a B-side to the "One" single. The official recordings of "Am I Evil?", "Helpless" and "The Prince" would also be featured on Metallica's two-CD Garage Inc. compilation in 1998, a collection of numerous cover songs that the band had played over the years. The first CD in the set was newly recorded covers, one of which was Diamond Head's "It's Electric".

During the Wherever We May Roam Tour Metallica played "Am I Evil?" and "Helpless" with the original Diamond Head members on 5 November 1992 at NEC Arena in Birmingham.

Metallica performed "Am I Evil?" along with the other bands in the Big 4 (Megadeth, Anthrax and Slayer) at the 2011 Sonisphere festival, and with Diamond Head themselves at the Sonisphere festival in Knebworth on 8 July 2011. The following day Brian performed "Helpless" with Metallica and Anthrax at the Sonisphere festival in Amnéville, France.

On 5 December 2011, Brian Tatler and Sean Harris joined Metallica onstage at the Fillmore Auditorium in San Francisco to celebrate Metallica's 30th Anniversary. Together they played "The Prince", "It's Electric", "Helpless" and "Am I Evil?". Tatler and Harris also took part in a group encore of "Seek and Destroy". Metallica have performed "Am I Evil?" onstage over 750 times.

Band members
Current
Brian Tatler – lead guitar, backing vocals (1976–1985, 1991–1994, 2000–present)
Karl Wilcox – drums (1991–1994, 2002–present)
Andy "Abbz" Abberley – rhythm and lead guitar (2006–present)
Rasmus Bom Andersen – lead vocals (2014–present)
Paul Gaskin - bass, backing vocals (2022–present)
Former
Sean Harris – lead vocals, rhythm guitar (1976–1985, 1990–1994, 2000–2004)
Colin Kimberley – bass, backing vocals (1978–1983)
Duncan Scott – drums (1976–1983)
Robbie France – drums (1983–1985; died 2012)
Mervyn Goldsworthy – bass (1983–1984)
Josh Phillips – keyboards (1983–1984)
Dave Williamson – bass, backing vocals (1984–1985)
Eddie Moohan – bass, backing vocals (1991–1992, 2002–2016)
Pete Vuckovic – bass, backing vocals (1992–1994)
Floyd Brennan – rhythm guitar, backing vocals (2000–2002)
Rob Mills – rhythm guitar (2003–2006)
Nick Tart – lead vocals (2004–2014)
Dean Ashton – bass, backing vocals (2016–2022)

Timeline

Discography

Studio albums
 Lightning to the Nations (1980) 
 Borrowed Time (1982) – [UK No. 24]
 Canterbury (1983) – [UK No. 32]
 Death and Progress (1993)
 All Will Be Revealed (2005)
 What's In Your Head? (2007)
 Diamond Head (2016) – [UK Rock No. 15] 
 The Coffin Train (2019) – [UK Rock No. 5]
 Lightning To The Nations 2020 (2020) Re-recording with four bonus tracks.

Live albums
 The Friday Rock Show Sessions / Live at Reading (1992)
 Evil Live (1994)
 Live – In the Heat of the Night (2000)
 It's Electric (2006)
 Live at the BBC (2010)

Singles and EPs
 "Shoot Out the Lights" (1979)
 "Sweet and Innocent" (1980)
 "Waited Too Long"/"Play It Loud" (1981)
 Diamond Lights EP (1981)
 Call Me EP (1982) 
 Four Cuts EP (1982)
 In the Heat of the Night (1982) – [UK No. 67]
 Makin' Music (1983) – [UK No. 87]
 Out of Phase (1983) – [UK No. 80]
 "Wild on the Streets"/"I Can't Help Myself" 12" (1991)
 Rising Up (1992)
 Acoustic: First Cuts EP (2002)
 Belly of the Beast 7" clear promo Flexi disc (2019)

Compilations
 Behold the Beginning (1986)
 Am I Evil (1987)
 Sweet and Innocent (1988)
 Singles (1992)
 Helpless (1996)
 To Heaven from Hell (1997)
 The Best of Diamond Head (1999)
 Diamond Nights (2000)
 The Diamond Head Anthology: Am I Evil? (2004)
 The MCA Years (2009)
 Lightning to the Nations: The White Album (2011)
 Am I Evil?: The Best Of (2013)

DVDs
 To the Devil His Due (21 November 2006)

See also
List of new wave of British heavy metal bands

References

External links

Official website

English heavy metal musical groups
British speed metal musical groups
People from Stourbridge
Musical quartets
Musical quintets
Musical groups established in 1976
Musical groups disestablished in 1985
Musical groups reestablished in 1991
Musical groups disestablished in 1994
Musical groups reestablished in 2000
1976 establishments in England
New Wave of British Heavy Metal musical groups
MCA Records artists